Luncuța River may refer to:

 Luncuța River (Paroș)
 Luncuța, a tributary of the Săliște in Sibiu County

See also 
 Lunca River (disambiguation)
 Luncavița River (disambiguation)
 Luncșoara River (disambiguation)